Red salute may refer to:

 Red Salute (1935 film), a 1935 American film directed by Sidney Lanfield
 Red Salute (2006 film), a 2006 Malayalam film
 Raised fist, a political gesture often associated with communism and socialism used to express unity, strength, or resistance.
 Lal Salam (red salute), a salute used by Communists in South Asia